Roger Hugh Cook (born 20 August 1965) is an Australian politician who is the current Deputy Premier of Western Australia, under Mark McGowan. He has been a member of the Legislative Assembly of Western Australia since 2008, representing the seat of Kwinana. He was elected deputy leader of the Labor Party ten days after first being elected to parliament, and continues to hold the position. Before entering politics, Cook worked as a public relations consultant. He had earlier been involved in student politics, serving as the first president of the National Union of Students.

Early life
Cook was born in Perth, and attended Scotch College. He went on to Murdoch University, completing a Bachelor of Arts degree in public administration, and later completed a graduate business diploma (specialising in public relations) and also a Masters of Business Administration at Curtin University. Whilst at Murdoch, Cook became involved in student politics, serving as a student representative on the university's senate. He was also involved in the establishment of the National Union of Students in mid-1986, becoming its first national president as a representative of the National Organisation of Labor Students.

After graduating, Cook worked in the offices of a number of Labor MPs, including Stephen Smith, Jim McGinty, and Chris Evans. He served as state president of the Labor Party from 1999 to 2000. Cook later became involved with Aboriginal advocacy groups, serving at various times as a policy coordinator for the Western Australian Aboriginal Native Title Working Group, as CEO of the Yamatji Marlpa Barna Baba Maaja Aboriginal Corporation, and as government relations manager for the South West Aboriginal Land and Sea Council. From 2004 to 2008, he was state manager of CPR, a public relations firm which is closely associated with the Labor Party.

Politics
At the 2008 state election, Cook won the seat of Kwinana in a tightly fought contest, winning by 300 votes from independent candidate Carol Adams, the mayor of the City of Kwinana. Adams had unsuccessfully attempted to gain Labor pre-selection, and later accused Alan Carpenter of "parachuting" Cook into the seat. On 16 September, ten days after the election, Cook was elected to the position of deputy leader of the Labor Party under Eric Ripper. He is a member of the Labor Left faction, backed by the United Voice trade union (previously known as the Liquor, Hospitality and Miscellaneous Union). After Ripper was replaced by Mark McGowan as leader of the opposition in January 2012, Cook maintained his position as deputy leader. He was re-elected at the 2013 state election in a rematch with Adams, winning an increased majority.

However, Kwinana was a very safe Labor seat in a "traditional" two-party matchup with the Liberals; Cook would have won it in both 2008 and 2013 with majorities of well over 10 percent in a traditional contest with a Liberal candidate. Proving this, Cook was easily reelected in 2017 amid the massive Labor wave that swept through Perth, taking over 68 percent of the two-party vote, a "traditional" two-party swing of seven percent.

After a ministerial reshuffle in December 2021, Cook was removed from the Health Ministry in favour of Amber-Jade Sanderson. He assumed the portfolio of Tourism, while retaining his status as Deputy Premier, and the ministries of State Development, Jobs and Trade, and Commerce and Science. After another reshuffle in December 2022, Cook became the minister for hydrogen industry, taking over from the retiring Alannah MacTiernan, and was succeeded as the minister for commerce by Sue Ellery.

Portfolios

Cook has held the following portfolios since his election in 2008:
 26 September 2008 – 27 January 2012: Deputy Leader of the Opposition; Shadow Minister for Health; Shadow Minister for Mental Health; Shadow Minister for Indigenous Affairs
 27 January 2012 – 9 April 2013: Deputy Leader of the Opposition; Shadow Minister for Health
 9 April 2013 – 26 June 2015: Deputy Leader of the Opposition; Shadow Minister for Health; Shadow Minister for Science
 26 June 2015 – 17 March 2017: Deputy Leader of the Opposition; Shadow Minister for Health
 17 March 2017 – 21 December 2021: Minister for Health and Minister for Mental Health
 21 December 2021 – 14 December 2022: Deputy Premier; Minister for Tourism; State Development, Jobs and Trade; Commerce and Science
 14 December 2022 – present: Deputy Premier; Minister for State Development, Jobs and Trade; Hydrogen Industry; Tourism; Science

References

1965 births
Living people
Labor Left politicians
Australian Labor Party members of the Parliament of Western Australia
Members of the Western Australian Legislative Assembly
Murdoch University alumni
Politicians from Perth, Western Australia
21st-century Australian politicians
People educated at Scotch College, Perth
Curtin University alumni